Robin Erewa (born 24 June 1991) is a German sprinter specialising in the 200 metres. He competed at the 2015 World Championships in Beijing without advancing from the first round. Born of a Nigerian father, he first played football before switching to athletics at the age of 12.

Competition record

Personal bests
Outdoor
100 metres – 10.31 (+0.8 m/s, Ulm 2014)
200 metres – 20.46 (+1.7 m/s, Mannheim 2014)
Indoor
60 metres – 6.80 (Leipzig 2016)
200 metres – 20.56 (Leipzig 2014)

References

External links
 

1991 births
Living people
German male sprinters
World Athletics Championships athletes for Germany
German sportspeople of Nigerian descent
Sportspeople from Oberhausen
Athletes (track and field) at the 2016 Summer Olympics
Olympic athletes of Germany